Jens Tolv Beck (16 April 1890 – 11 February 1939) was a Norwegian farmer and politician for the Agrarian Party.

He was born in Horten as a son of bank treasurer Christian Barth Beck (1846–1904) and Louise Steenberg (1861–1929). He finished middle school in 1906, then Fosnes Agricultural School in 1910 and was a tenant at several farms; from 1917 to 1919 in Sweden. In 1924 he bought the farm Søndre Ruus in Nittedal where he later settled. His specialty was poultry breeding.

He was elected as a deputy representative to the Parliament of Norway in 1936 from the constituency Akershus. He died in February 1939, before the end of the term.

References

1890 births
1939 deaths
People from Horten
Norwegian College of Agriculture alumni
Norwegian farmers
People from Nittedal
Akershus politicians
Deputy members of the Storting
Centre Party (Norway) politicians